UN numbers from UN0101 to UN0200 as assigned by the United Nations Committee of Experts on the Transport of Dangerous Goods are as follows:


UN 0101 to UN 0200

See also
Lists of UN numbers

References

Lists of UN numbers